Hyperion may refer to:

Greek mythology 
 Hyperion (Titan), one of the twelve Titans 
 Hyperion, a byname of the Sun, Helios
 Hyperion of Troy or Yperion, son of King Priam

Science
 Hyperion (moon), a moon of the planet Saturn
 Hyperion (beetle), a genus of beetles in the family Carabidae
 Hyperion (tree), a coast redwood in Northern California and the world's tallest known living tree
 Hyperion proto-supercluster, a supercluster of galaxy groups discovered in 2018
 Project Hyperion (interstellar), preliminary study of a crewed interstellar starship or generation ship

Literature

 Hyperion (Hölderlin novel), a 1799 book by Friedrich Hölderlin
 Hyperion (poem), a 1819 poem by John Keats
 Hyperion (Longfellow novel), an 1839 book by Henry Wadsworth Longfellow
 Hyperion (Simmons novel), a 1989 novel by Dan Simmons
 Hyperion Cantos, the series of novels that started with Hyperion
 Hyperion (magazine), a 1908–1910 German literary journal
 Hyperion (comics), the name of several characters in the Marvel Comics universe

Music
 Hyperion (Gesaffelstein album) or the title song, 2019
 Hyperion (Manticora album), 2002
 Hyperion (Marilyn Crispell, Peter Brötzmann and Hamid Drake album) or the title song, 1995
 Hyperion (EP), by Krallice, or the title song, 2016
 Hyperion, an album by St. Lucia, 2018
 "Hyperion", a song by McFly from The Lost Songs, 2020
 Hyperion Records, an independent British classical music label

Businesses and organizations
 Hachette Books, a book publishing division known until 2014 as Hyperion Books
 Hyperion Books for Children, a book publisher
 Hyperion Entertainment, a computer game producer
 Hyperion Pictures, a film production company
 Hyperion Power Generation, a nuclear power company
 Hyperion Records, an independent British classical music label 
 Hyperion Theatricals, part of Disney Theatrical Group
 Oracle Hyperion, a business software company owned by Oracle

Places and facilities
 Hyperion, California, a stop on the Redondo Beach via Playa del Rey Line
 Hyperion Theater, a theater at the Disney California Adventure theme park in Anaheim, California
 Hyperion sewage treatment plant, Playa del Rey, California
 Hyperion Tower (or Mok-dong Hyperion Towers), Seoul, South Korea

Fictional entities and characters
 Hyperion, the flagship of Jim Raynor in StarCraft
 Hyperion Corporation, an organization in the Borderlands series
 Hyperion, a Gallente battleship in Eve Online
 Hyperion UCS Mk.XII, a military satellite from  Einhänder
 Hyperion, Seifer Almasy's weapon in Final Fantasy VIII
 Ark Hyperion, one of the four Ark starships in Mass Effect: Andromeda
 Hyperion, an airship in the film The Island at the Top of the World
 Hyperion, an airship in the novel Skybreaker
 Hyperion, a ship in the TV series Skyland
 Hyperion, the flagship of Yang Wenli, a Legend of the Galactic Heroes character
 Emperor Hyperion, chief of the alien villains' race in the anime series Gekiganger III
 Hyperion Hotel, a fictional home base for Angel in the television series Angel
 Hyperion, a fictional boss in the video game Returnal

Computing
 Hyperion (computer), an early portable computer
 Hyperion, a RuneScape emulator by Graham Edgecombe
 Hyperion, a hyperspectral imaging spectrometer on the NASA Earth Observing-1 satellite
 Hyperion, Disney's rendering system first used for Big Hero 6 (film)
 Nvidia Drive Hyperion, a series of semiconductor related evaluation board and software bundles for high end automotive computation purposes

Ships
 Hyperion (ship), three commercial ships
 Hyperion (yacht), a large sloop launched in 1998
 HMS Hyperion, three ships of the British Royal Navy
 USS Hyperion (AK-107), a World War II US Navy cargo ship

Other uses
 Hyperion (horse) (1930–1960), a British Thoroughbred horse
 Hyperion (roller coaster), a roller coaster in Poland
 Hyperion, a sculpture by Angela Laich after the Friedrich Hölderlin novel
 Hyperion, a version of the Rolls-Royce Phantom Drophead Coupé
 Hyperion XP-1 hydrogen-powered "supercar" from Hyperion Motors.